Louise Charbonneau is the Chief Justice of the Northwest Territories. She was appointed before 2012.

References 

Living people
Year of birth missing (living people)